Victoria and Merrie England, billed as a "Grand National Ballet in Eight Tableaux" is an 1897 ballet by the choreographer Carlo Coppi with music by Arthur Sullivan, written to commemorate Queen Victoria's Diamond Jubilee, commemorating her sixty years on the throne. The ballet became very popular and ran for nearly six months.

Background
In honour of the Jubilee, Alfred Maul, manager of the Alhambra Theatre, asked Sullivan to compose a patriotic ballet to a scenario by the theatre's resident choreographer, Coppi. As the nation's pre-eminent composer, Sullivan was the natural choice to write the music. An alternate Jubilee composition, a poem submitted to Sullivan by the Poet Laureate, Alfred Austin, was never set.

Sullivan composed the piece mostly on the French Riviera, combining the task with visits to the casino. Nevertheless, he took the commission seriously and produced one of his few successes in the decade of the 1890s. Victoria and Merrie England opened on 25 May 1897 and ran for six months at the Alhambra Theatre, which was a generous run for this kind of piece. Members of the British royal family were reported to have attended at least nineteen times. The orchestra was under the direction of the Alhambra's resident conductor Georges Jacobi.

Description of the ballet
Although Sullivan's autograph manuscript does not survive, Roderick Spencer of the Sir Arthur Sullivan Society reconstructed the score from several sources, including earlier scores from which Sullivan drew, the piano reduction, and other clues that he gleaned from letters and news reports. Sullivan extracted three orchestral suites from the ballet, but only one of these survives. Sullivan's assistant, Wilfred Bendall, prepared the published piano reduction of the ballet.

The ballet consists of a series of seven historical vignettes in praise of Britain, such as "Ancient Britain," Christmas in the time of Charles II, and two scenes devoted to Queen Victoria. The score is a pot-pourri of characteristically English music. The staging too, was essentially British: the Sullivan scholar Selwyn Tillett writes of the Alhambra ballets that they had "little to do with the mainstream of classical ballet as it is understood today. Neither Swan Lake nor Sylvia was seen in London complete until the Dyagilev tour of 1911–12 ... cut off from the classical source, Alhambra ballet had developed in a unique direction of its own." Tillett describes the Alhambra ballets as  "mime-dramas" with many individual scenes and "speciality" dances. The work did not become part of the standard ballet repertoire. In the score, Sullivan re-used material from his Imperial March (1893) and his only other ballet, L'Ile Enchantée (1864). The final scene, after a depiction of Victoria's coronation, ends in a contemporary dance for soldiers from the various parts of Great Britain and its colonies and includes a counterpoint of characteristic tunes representing England, Scotland and Ireland, among which is Sullivan's own mock-patriotic "He is an Englishman", from H.M.S. Pinafore.

Summary of scenes
Scene I – Ancient Britain
An oak forest, night – Britannia asleep – Britain's Guardian Spirit – Sacred March of the Druids – Rites of the Mistletoe – Britannia awakes.
In an oak forest in the era of the Druids, Britannia is seen sleeping. She is greeted by "England's Guardian Genius". A procession of Druids and Priestesses arrive, and various Druidical rites and sacred dances ensue. Noticing Britannia sleeping, the High Priest prophesies her future greatness, and everyone kneels to her.

Scenes II & III – May Day in Queen Elizabeth's Time
Village green – young heir comes of age. Procession of mummers and revellers – Historical Quadrille of Britons, Romans, Saxons and Normans – Morris Dance -Mazurka, Knights of the Sword and Rose Maidens – Flirtation, Robin Hood and Maid Marian – Friar Tuck and the Dragon – Two Hobby Horses – General Dance – Pas seul, May Queen – Maypole Dance.
In Scene II, during May Day festivities in the Elizabethan period, the Duke's eldest son comes of age. In Scene III the May Day festivities continue. Mummers and dancers arrive and perform a historical quadrille, a Morris dance, a Maypole dance and Jack in the Green.

Scenes IV & V – The Legend of Herne the Hunter
Windsor Forest, night – Storm – Dance of Hunters – Waltz of Wood Nymphs. Procession of the Yule Log – Galop – Fight of hunters and peasants – Dance of Hunters and Nymphs.
In the forest, a storm is raging. Herne's huntsmen arrive with their kills. Herne enters and commands the hunt to resume; as they move off, the weather calms. Nymphs dance before the Yule-log arrives, together with musicians, mummers and peasants. After dancing around the log, they finally drag it homeward. The nymphs and huntsmen dance together before Herne returns and scatters sends them.

Scene VI – Christmas Revels in the Time of Charles II
Castle Hall; servants, players and guests – Lord and Lady of the Manor – Procession of the Boar's Head and Roast Beef – Entrance of peasants and vassals - Comic Pas de Quatre (Fugue) – Drunken Jester's Dance – Blind Man's Buff – Entrance of Father Christmas – Kissing Dance under the Mistletoe.
In the Hall of an old castle, servants arrange tables for the Christmas festivities. A feast is presided over by the Lord and Lady of the Manor. Vassals and peasants arrive and enjoy various revels and games such as Blind man's buff and a jester's dance. Father Christmas bestows gifts, and everyone dances under the mistletoe.

Scene VII – Coronation of Queen Victoria Westminster Abbey, 28 June 1838 – Imperial March.
Coronation of Queen Victoria, Westminster Abbey, 28 June 1838 – Imperial March.
Tableau vivant of the Coronation of the Queen, incorporating Sullivan's Imperial March.

Scene VIII – 1897 – Britain's Glory
Entrance of English, Irish and Scottish Troops – The Union – Artists' Volunteers – Colonial Troops – Military Manoeuvres – Sailors' Hornpipe – Pas Redouble -Entrance of Britannia -- The Albert Memorial – God Save the Queen!
English, Irish, Scottish and colonial troops arrive, who afterwards manoeuvre together. Volunteers and colonials follow, and sailors dance a hornpipe. Britannia for a final tableau.

References

External links
Summary of the ballet
Review in The Times, 26 May 1897
1897 Programme and illustrations
 . This also provides the synopsis of scenes and stage directions.

Ballets by Arthur Sullivan
1897 ballet premieres
Cultural depictions of Queen Victoria